The Minister for Women is the government minister in the New Zealand Government with responsibility for the rights and interests of the country's female citizens. It has been a post in all New Zealand governments since 1984. The Minister leads the Ministry for Women.

The post was established by the Fourth Labour Government on 26 July 1984 preceding the creation of the ministry. It was split from the Social Welfare portfolio after a recommendation from Advisory Committee on Women's Affairs. Holders of the post were known as the Minister for Women's Affairs until December 2014, with the department known as the Ministry of Women's Affairs. There had been a previous ministerial post from 1949 to 1972 adjunct to the Social Security portfolio titled Minister for the Welfare of Women and Children with a similar brief.

Ministers for Women 
The following ministers have held the office:

Key

Notes

References

Lists of government ministers of New Zealand
Political office-holders in New Zealand